The Royal Saudi Navy or Royal Saudi Naval Forces, is the maritime arm of the Saudi Arabian Armed Forces and one of the five service branches of the Ministry of Defense of Saudi Arabia. Its primary role is monitoring and defending the Saudi territorial waters against military or economic intrusion, and participating in international naval alliances.

The Navy operates from multiple bases along the  Saudi coastline, with two fleets.
 The Eastern Fleet operates in the Persian Gulf from the King Abdulaziz Naval Base at Jubail.
 The Western Fleet operates in the Red Sea from the King Faisal Naval Base at Jeddah.
Each fleet has a full military capability including warships, support ships, administrative and technical support, naval aviation, marines and special security units.

History
The Navy was founded in 1960 and began a significant expansion with United States assistance in 1972 aiming to match the Imperial Iranian Navy. Following the Iranian Revolution a further expansion programme, Sawari, was initiated with French assistance. Further vessels were purchased from Britain and France in the 1980s and 1990s. In 1980, U.S. defense contractor Science Applications International Corporation began work with the Royal Saudi Navy to design and integrate the country's own command, control, and communications (C3) centers.

Ships

The navy is a modern force with foreign built ships:
 French-built frigates and support vessels
 U.S.-built corvettes and patrol boats
 British-built s

Frigates

4 Multi-Mission Surface Combatant (MMSC) ordered by Royal Saudi Navy in 2019. The ship is derived from the Freedom-class littoral combat ship but with upgraded features. The deliveries of the MMSC will begin in June 2023.

Each has a fully loaded displacement of 4,725 tons, and is armed with eight MBDA Exocet MM40 Block II surface-to-surface missiles (SSM), two eight-cell Sylver vertical launch systems for the Eurosam (MBDA and Thales) Aster 15 surface-to-air missile (SAM), an Oto Melara 76 mm/62 Super Rapid gun, and four 533 mm aft torpedo tubes. The ships are armed with the DCNS F17 heavyweight anti-submarine torpedo. The helicopter deck at the stern has a single landing spot for a medium size helicopter, such as the Eurocopter AS 365 Dauphin or the larger AS 532 Cougar or NH90 helicopters.

4 Al Madinah-class frigates based in the Red Sea, built in France (Arsenal de Marine, Lorient (French Government Dockyard and CNIM, La Seyne) in the mid-1980s. Their full load displacement is 2,610 tons and they are armed with eight Otomat surface-to-surface missiles, one 8-cell Crotale surface-to-air missile launcher (26 missiles total), one 100 mm/44 dual purpose gun, two 40 mm anti-aircraft guns, four torpedo tubes, an aft helicopter deck and hangar; one Dauphin helicopter.

It was believed the Saudis intended to order two new British-built Type 45 destroyers, however production of the destroyers came to an end with no order made. Another destroyer that the Saudis are considering is the American built , having been briefed by the US Navy in May 2011 on the acquisition of two destroyers in a package that also includes an unknown number of Littoral Combat Ships.

Corvettes

5 Avante-class corvettes ordered by Royal Saudi Navy in 2018. The corvettes built by Spanish company Navantia. 

4 s built in the United States in 1981–83, based in the Persian Gulf, full load displacement of 1,038 tons, armament of eight Harpoon SSM, one 76 mm OTO Melara DP gun, one 20 mm Phalanx CIWS, two 20 mm guns, one 81 mm mortar, two 40 mm grenade launchers, two triple 12.75 inch torpedo tubes.

Patrol boats
9 Al Sadiq-class patrol boats built in the United States (Peterson Builders, Sturgeon Bay, Wisconsin) 1972–1980, full load displacement of 495 tons, armed with four Harpoon SSM, one 76 mm OTO gun, one 20 mm Phalanx CIWS, two 20 mm guns, one 81 mm mortar, two 40 mm grenade launchers, two triple 12.75 inch torpedo tubes.

 Possible sale of 30 Mark V Special Operations Craft

Minesweepers
3 s (built by Vosper Thornycroft, Woolston), full load displacement of 480 tons:

Support vessels
2 French built  (modified  replenishment ships built by CN La Ciotat, with a helicopter deck aft and hangars for 2 helicopters.

Others
Many smaller patrol craft, two Danish-built royal yachts
 Prince Abdul Aziz (1983–84) – built by Helsingør Værft
 Al Yamana (Built for Iraq 1981; entered service in Saudi Arabia in 1988)

Naval aviation

Marines
The Royal Saudi Navy maintains two, 1,500-man marine brigades consisting of three battalions each. The brigades are assigned to the Western Fleet headquartered in Jeddah and the Eastern Fleet headquartered in Jubail. The brigades are equipped with 200 Pegaso BMR AFVs and HMMWVs.

Future

Germany will supply 48 patrol boats to Saudi Arabia within the framework of its border security project, a cost of 1.5 billion euros has been noted for this deal. Lürssen has already started building 15 patrol vessels for the project's first phase. The patrol boats to be procured under the current contract come in two forms. The first are the 'TNC 35' models, which are 35-meter-long and are propelled by two diesel engines with a combined output of 7,800 kilowatts. The boat can reach speeds of up to 40 knots. The second models, 'FPB 38' are 38-meter-long and can reach speeds of up to 31 knots. As of November 2016 1 TNC 35 has been delivered to Saudi Arabia.

Saudi Arabia wants to buy five German submarines for around €2.5 billion ($3.4 billion) and more than two dozen more in the future.

In December 2014, the U.S. awarded Lockheed Martin a contract for a Foreign Military Sale of the Mk 41 Vertical Launching System to Saudi Arabia. With no surface ships compatible with the Mk 41 and no plans to acquire a land-based missile defense system, this indicates the country is close to purchasing a VLS-equipped surface combatant. In October 2015, the US Congress was informed of a possible sale of Multi-Mission Surface Combatant (MMSC) Ships, a variant of the LCS.

In July 2018 it was announced that Navantia had signed an agreement with the Royal Saudi Navy for the production of 5 Avante 2000 Corvettes with the last to be delivered by 2022 at a cost of approximately 2 billion Euros.

Bases 

 Jeddah (Al-Qadima military port)– Red Sea base home to the navy's Western fleet for frigates and 2 missile boats, 1 replenishing ship and 1 patrol minesweeper; located north of the King Faisal Naval Base air station and south of the container port area
 Jubail – Persian Gulf base is home to the navy's Eastern fleet; smaller base home to corvettes, replenishing ship remaining missile boats and minesweepers
 Dammam (Ras Al-Ghar military port) – Persian Gulf home port for the Saudi Royal family's two Royal Yachts

Ranks

 Officer ranks

Other ranks
The rank insignia of non-commissioned officers and enlisted personnel.

Incidents
On 30 January 2017 Al-Madinah was attacked by Houthi rebels using a suicide boat, killing 2 sailors and wounding 3 others. The attack took place near the port city of Al Hudaydah, 150 kilometers southwest of the Yemeni capital Sana'a.

References

See also
 Coast guard

Sources
 Conway's All the World's Fighting Ships 1947–1995

Notes

 
Navy
Navies by country
Military units and formations established in 1789
18th-century establishments in the Arabian Peninsula
1789 establishments in Asia